Texas Proposition 4 may refer to various ballot measures in Texas, including:

2007 Texas Proposition 4
2021 Texas Proposition 4